Mathias Kristensen may refer to:
 Mathias Kristensen (footballer, born 1993), Danish footballer
 Mathias Kristensen (footballer, born 1997), Danish footballer